The 1979 Bauchi State gubernatorial election occurred on July 28, 1979. NPN's Abubakar Tatari Ali won election for a first term to become Bauchi State's first executive governor leading and, defeating main opposition in the contest.

Electoral system
The Governor of Bauchi State is elected using the plurality voting system.

Results
There were five political parties registered by the Federal Electoral Commission (FEDECO) to participate in the election. Tatari Ali of the NPN won the contest by polling the highest votes.

References 

Bauchi State gubernatorial elections
Bauchi State gubernatorial election
Bauchi State gubernatorial election